Konstantynów  is a village in Płock County, Masovian Voivodeship, Poland with population of 38 people.

From 1974 to 1991 the tallest ever manmade structure stood here, the Warsaw radio mast. This mast was a  guyed radio mast in steel-framework construction with triangular cross section with a side length of 4.8 metres and a weight of 420 tons. The mast was used for the 2000 kilowatt long wave transmitter of the Polish broadcasting authority as aerial and was therefore insulated against ground for a voltage of 120 kilovolts. It collapsed during renovation work on August 8, 1991. Nobody was reported killed in the accident.

Villages in Płock County